Illya Andreyevich Hawrylaw (born 26 September 1988) is a Belarusian professional football player. He also holds Russian citizenship.

Match fixing
On 20 February 2018, the BFF banned him from football for life for his involvement in the match-fixing.

References

External links

1988 births
Living people
Belarusian footballers
Belarusian expatriate footballers
Expatriate footballers in Russia
FC Molodechno players
FC Dnepr Mogilev players
FC Torpedo-BelAZ Zhodino players
FC Volgar Astrakhan players
FC Khimki players
FC Rotor Volgograd players
FC Shakhtyor Soligorsk players
FC Granit Mikashevichi players
FC Luch Vladivostok players
Association football goalkeepers
FC Dinamo Minsk players
FC Moscow players
FC Avangard Kursk players
Sportspeople from Vitebsk